Viburnum trilobum (cranberrybush viburnum, American cranberrybush, high bush cranberry, or highbush cranberry) is a species of Viburnum native to northern North America, from Newfoundland west to British Columbia, south to Washington state and east to northern Virginia. It is very closely related to the European and Asian Viburnum opulus, and is often treated as a variety of it, as Viburnum opulus L. var. americanum Ait., or as a subspecies, Viburnum opulus subsp. trilobum (Marshall) Clausen.

Description
The bark is gray and rough and has a scaly texture. The stems arch and are very dense, and the twigs are a reddish-brown color. The leaf buds are green. The bud scales are valvate. Plants begin to produce fruit at approximately five years of age; when animals, including birds, eat the fruits, they deposit the seeds in another location in their droppings.

Uses
Although often called "highbush cranberry", it is not a cranberry. The name comes from the red fruits which look superficially like cranberries, and have a similar flavor and ripen at the same time of year. After removing the large seeds, the fruits, sour and rich in vitamin C, can be eaten raw or cooked into a sauce to serve with meat or game.

Pests and diseases
The larvae and adults of the Viburnum leaf beetle feed on the leaves and may completely defoliate the plant, and repeated damage can kill it.

In culture
This is a commonly used berry in western Canadian cultures. Peoples of various origins both Native and European have used the berries for many years.

The Canadian French name for the berries is pembina. The name pembina was then applied to three rivers, one in Manitoba and North Dakota, one in Ontario, and one in Alberta.

References

External links

UConn Plant Database: Viburnum trilobum

Berries
First Nations culture
Flora of Alberta
Flora of Ontario
Plants used in Native American cuisine
trilobum
Flora without expected TNC conservation status